Palestine is a non-fiction graphic novel written and drawn by Joe Sacco about his experiences in the West Bank and the Gaza Strip in December 1991 and January 1992.  Sacco's portrayal of the situation emphasizes the history and plight of the Palestinian people, as a group and as individuals.

Publication history
The complete graphic novel, published in 2001 by Fantagraphics Books, collects nine issues of Sacco's Palestine comic book, published by Fantagraphics from 1993 to 1995; the single volume edition includes an introduction by Edward Said. In 1996, Fantagraphics had released a two-part collection of the series — Palestine, a Nation Occupied (collecting Palestine #1-5) and Palestine: In the Gaza Strip (collecting issues #6-9). An expanded edition was released in 2007.

Plot summary
The book takes place over a two-month period in late 1991 / early 1992, with occasional flashbacks to the expulsion of the Arabs, the beginning of the Intifada, the Gulf War and other events in the more immediate past. Sacco spent this time meeting with Palestinians in the West Bank and Gaza Strip and the narrative focuses on the minute details of everyday life in these area.

In Palestine Sacco positions himself knowingly as the westerner going to the Middle East to confront a reality unfamiliar to his American audience. Sacco does not delude himself that as a "neutral" observer he can remain invisible and have no effect on the events around him, instead accepting his role and concentrating on his personal experience of the situation. Though his goal is to document events and interview Palestinians he is affected by the reality of the occupied territories and cannot help but participate in, and comment on, demonstrations, funerals, roadblocks and encounters with soldiers. Towards the end he becomes even more active as he shares food and lodgings with the Palestinians he interviews and even breaks curfew with them while in the Gaza Strip.

In the book Sacco references Joseph Conrad's Under Western Eyes, Heart of Darkness, and Edward Said's Orientalism to draw links between the situation he is witnessing and colonialism. Towards the end of the book, when challenged by an Israeli that he hasn't experienced their point of view, he responds that the Israeli point of view is what he has internalized his whole life, and although another trip would be necessary to fully experience Israel, that was not why he was there.

Awards 
The 1996 two-volume collection of Palestine was awarded the 1996 American Book Award by the Before Columbus Foundation. In 1999, The Comics Journal (like Palestine, also published by Fantagraphics) named Palestine as #27 in the Top 100 English-Language Comics of the Century.

See also
Comics journalism
New Journalism

References

Further reading 
 Gadassik, Alla and Sarah Henstra. "Comics (as) Journalism: Teaching Joe Sacco's Palestine to Media Students," in Teaching Comics and Graphic Narratives (Jefferson, N.C.: McFarland & Company, 2012), pp. 243–259.
Stack, Frank. "Pilgrimage: Palestine #1-5," The Comics Journal #166 (Feb. 1994), pp. 51–53.
 Woo, Benjamin. "Reconsidering Comics Journalism : Information and Experience in Joe Sacco's Palestine," The Rise and Reason of Comics and Graphic Literature (Jefferson, NC: McFarland & Co., 2010), pp. 166–177.
Hillary Chute. Disaster Drawn (Cambridge, MA: Harvard University Press, 2016).

External links
Fantagraphics page
Joe Sacco on Footnotes in Gaza and Palestine - Interview on the 7th Avenue Project radio show

1996 graphic novels
Books about Palestinians
Israeli–Palestinian conflict books
Comics by Joe Sacco
Fantagraphics titles
Non-fiction graphic novels
Non-fiction comics